Snake Alley may refer to:

 Snake Alley (Burlington, Iowa), a sinuous street in Iowa, US
 Snake Alley Criterium, an annual bicycle race in Burlington
 Snake Alley Historic District, a largely residential area in Burlington
 Snake Alley (Taipei), a market in Taipei, Taiwan
 "Snake Alley", a track on the 1985 album Decode Yourself by Ronald Shannon Jackson

See also
Crookedest street (disambiguation)